Porziņģis may refer to:
 Jānis Porziņģis (1982), Latvian professional basketball player
 Kristaps Porziņģis (1995), Latvian professional basketball player in the NBA

Latvian-language surnames